Vazhsky is a rural locality (a settlement) in Kitskoye Rural Settlement of Vinogradovsky District, Arkhangelsk Oblast, Russia. The population was 423 as of 2010. There are 6 streets.

Geography 
Vazhsky is located on the Vaga River, 32 km southeast of Bereznik (the district's administrative centre) by road. Bereznichek is the nearest rural locality.

References 

Rural localities in Vinogradovsky District